Mayluu-Suu (Mayli-Say) is a mining town in the Jalal-Abad Region of southern Kyrgyzstan. It is a city of regional significance, not part of a district. It has been economically depressed since the fall of the Soviet Union. Uranium mining and processing is no longer economical, leaving much of the local population of about 20,000 without meaningful work. The town was classified as one of the Soviet government's secret cities, officially known only as "Mailbox 200". Mayluu-Suu consists of the town proper, the urban-type settlement Kök-Tash and the villages Sary-Bee, Kögoy and Kara-Jygach.

Population

Uranium mills

The USSR left 23 unstable uranium tailings pits on the tectonically unstable hillside above the town. A breached tailings dam in April 1958 released  of radioactive tailings into the river Mayluu-Suu. In 1994, a landslide blocked the river, which flowed over its banks and flooded another waste reservoir.  A flood caused by a mudslide nearly submerged a tailings pit in 2002. Mayluu-Suu was found to be one of the 10 most polluted sites in the world in a study published in 2006 by the Blacksmith Institute. 

The World Bank approved a US$5 million grant to reclaim the tailings pits in 2004, and approved an additional $1 million grant for the project in 2011. However, grave threats still persist.

References

External links 
 Webpage of Blacksmith Institute about Mayluu-Suu, archived from the original
 Latest report on Pure Earth (formerly Blacksmith Institute), accessed 2021-02-19 

Populated places in Jalal-Abad Region
Uranium mines in the Soviet Union
Mines in Kyrgyzstan
Radioactively contaminated areas